High diving at the 2015 World Aquatics Championships was held between 3 and 5 August 2015 in Kazan, Russia.

Schedule
Two events were held.

All time are local (UTC+3).

Medal summary

Medal table

Medal events

References

External links
Official website 

 
High diving
2015
High diving at the World Aquatics Championships